August Adolph Gennerich (February 10, 1887 – December 1, 1936) was a New York City police officer, U.S. Secret Service Agent, and the bodyguard of Franklin D. Roosevelt.

Early life 
Gennerich was born on February 10, 1887, in Yorkville, Manhattan, New York.

Career 
In 1909, Gennerich became a police officer with the New York City Police. He was cited three times for bravery, once for capturing bandits who "had peppered him for a mile and a half" with a machine gun until their car overturned. He later became a member of the bomb squad. In 1929 he was assigned as a bodyguard whenever New York's governor was in the city. He was assigned to Albany with then-Governor Roosevelt.

In the winter of 1933, when the Roosevelts moved to Washington, D.C., Gennerich was given a 60-day leave of absence so that he could complete his 25 years on the force, and retire on a $1,500-a-year pension. This allowed him to join the United States Secret Service and continue to work as President Roosevelt's bodyguard.  The very first executive order issued by the newly-appointed President Roosevelt was Order 6071, which ensured Gennerich would be able to resume his position as Roosevelt's bodyguard immediately.  Gennerich had grown close to Roosevelt and his family; Eleanor Roosevelt said in an edition of her newspaper column My Day that "He was cheerful, kindly and always willing to think of other people. He would play the piano for hours to amuse the children at Warm Springs. One and all they loved him."

Personal life 
Gennerich died of a heart attack in the early hours of December 1, 1936, in Buenos Aires, Argentina, while dancing in a restaurant. Gennerich was 50. In a letter to his wife shortly after Gennerich's death, Franklin Roosevelt wrote "Good old Gus was the kind of loyal friend who simply cannot be replaced".

References

External links
Behind the scenes at the White House - a short 1930s interview with Gennerich
 

1887 births
1936 deaths
United States Secret Service agents
New York City Police Department officers
People from Yorkville, Manhattan